The Knowledge Totem Pole is a totem pole carved by Coast Salish artist Cicero August and sons Darrel and Doug August, installed outside the British Columbia Parliament Buildings, in Victoria, British Columbia. The pole was originally created for the 1994 Commonwealth Games.

The Knowledge Totem Pole was first restored in 2007 by Doug August Sr. (Hul'qumi'num: Sume'lh). It was refurbished again in 2021 under the supervision of Doug August Jr.

The totem pole consists of (from top to bottom) a loon, a fisher, the bone player, and a frog.

References

External links
 

1994 Commonwealth Games
Outdoor sculptures in Victoria, British Columbia
Totem poles in Canada